The Order of Ban Jelačić is the 10th most important medal given by the Republic of Croatia. The order was founded on April 1, 1995. The medal is awarded for excellence in the Armed Forces of the Republic of Croatia. It is named after the ban of Croatia Josip Jelačić.

References 

Orders, decorations, and medals of Croatia
Awards established in 1995
1995 establishments in Croatia